Joan Robin Kaufman is an American child psychologist who researches child abuse and neglect. She is a professor of psychiatry and behavioral sciences at the Johns Hopkins School of Medicine. She is the director of research at the center for child and family traumatic stress at the Kennedy Krieger Institute. Kaufman worked at the Yale School of Medicine from 1998 to 2015.

Life 
Kaufman completed a B.A. from Tufts University in 1981. She earned a Ph.D. at Yale University in 1990. Her dissertation was titled, Depressive disorders in maltreated children. Albert J. Solnit was her doctoral advisor. Kaufman worked at the Yale School of Medicine in the department of psychiatry from 1998 to 2015.

In 2015, she joined the Johns Hopkins School of Medicine as a professor of psychiatry and behavioral sciences. She is director of research at the center for child and family traumatic stress at Kennedy Krieger Institute. She researches different areas of child abuse and neglect including its neurobiology and social policies.

Selected works

References 

Living people
Year of birth missing (living people)
Place of birth missing (living people)
Tufts University alumni
Yale University alumni
Yale School of Medicine faculty
Johns Hopkins School of Medicine faculty
21st-century American psychologists
American child psychologists
American women psychologists
21st-century American women scientists
American medical researchers
Women medical researchers